Harvey the Hound is the mascot of the National Hockey League's Calgary Flames.  Introduced in 1983, Harvey was the first mascot in the NHL.  Harvey is described by the Flames as being 6'6" and 200 lbs. He was acquired as the Flames’ "first pound draft pick" in 1983.

History
Created, owned and performed by Grant Kelba, Harvey made his debut in 1983 serving as the mascot of the Flames and later as a second mascot for the Calgary Stampeders of the Canadian Football League.  His popularity with the Flames was such that many teams contacted Kelba about making mascots for their own teams.

His first game, February 16, 1984 was a Flames rout over the Pittsburgh Penguins, 10 – 3 at the Olympic Saddledome.  Both Lanny McDonald and Doug Risebrough scored hat tricks and ever since Harvey has been a fixture with the Flames.  Harvey has remained a mainstay at Flames games, and at many events throughout Calgary and southern Alberta ever since.

Under Kelba's management, Harvey was invited by the NHL to attend 7 All Star Games and tour Japan to promote the NHL over there. Kelba sold Harvey to the Flames in 1996 and stayed on performing until his retirement in 1999. After a 15-year career, Kelba has moved on to other creative ventures and left a legacy of mascot performances that still solidify his reputation for a quality performance without creating controversy or problems. "Kelba's act was just good clean fun". Kelba was long since retired by the time of the tongue incident.

Tongue Incident
Harvey gained widespread publicity on January 20, 2003 at the Pengrowth Saddledome, following an incident with the Edmonton Oilers head coach, Craig MacTavish.  With the Flames leading 4–0, Harvey was taunting the Oilers behind their bench. The Oilers squirted him and eventually a frustrated coach reached up and ripped Harvey's signature red tongue out of his mouth, tossing it into the crowd.  The incident seemed to spark the Oilers, who scored three goals shortly after, though the Flames held on to win 4–3. During the post-game, MacTavish preceded with a comment on the incident.  
The incident made headlines throughout North America, and led to many jokes, including having many other NHL team mascots arrive at the 2003 All-Star Game with their tongues hanging out.

Harvey also had a long-running, good-natured feud with TSN broadcaster Gary Green, which began in the late eighties when Green was broadcasting for the rival Winnipeg Jets. Whenever Green worked a game at the Saddledome, Harvey would display a sign that mocked the broadcaster in some way, prompting an on-air response from Green that feigned contempt.

See also
 List of NHL mascots

References

External links
Harvey's Corner at calgaryflames.com

Calgary Flames
National Hockey League team mascots
Dog mascots
Canadian mascots
Fictional characters from Alberta
Culture of Calgary
Mascots introduced in 1983
1983 establishments in Alberta